Peter Demetz (born Petr Demetz; October 21, 1922) is an American literature scholar of Germany and a Sterling Professor emeritus at Yale University, and also a published author. He was formerly the Craig Distinguished Visiting Professor at Rutgers University.

Demetz turned 100 in October 2022.

Selected publications

References

1922 births
Living people
Yale University faculty
Yale University Department of German Faculty
Professors of German in the United States
Yale Sterling Professors
21st-century American historians
American male non-fiction writers
Writers from Prague
21st-century American male writers
Presidents of the Modern Language Association
German centenarians
American centenarians
Men centenarians